"Salt" is a song by American singer Ava Max, released on December 12, 2019, through Atlantic Records as the first promotional single from her debut studio album, Heaven & Hell (2020). The song was initially released on YouTube and SoundCloud in 2018, before being re-released on streaming services. It was written by Max, Autumn Rowe, Madison Love, Nicole Morier, and the producer Cirkut. The dance-pop song is regarded as a "fan-favorite" by several publications, who praised the upbeat production. "Salt" peaked at number one in Poland, and charted in the top 10 in Austria, CIS, Finland, Germany, Norway, Russia, Ukraine, and Switzerland. The song received a quadruple platinum certification in Poland and Norway, and was certified platinum in four countries.

Background and composition
"Salt" was initially released on YouTube and SoundCloud in 2018, where it gained 4 million views on the former by December 2019. On December 5, 2019, Max revealed the release date on social media, which was subsequently re-released as a digital single on several streaming services on December 12, 2019. She acknowledged that the song's re-release was due to its high streaming numbers, despite containing no prior marketing or promotion. It was written by Max, Autumn Rowe, Madison Love, Nicole Morier, and the producer Cirkut.

"Salt" is a dance-pop song, with elements of disco. It contains "pumping disco beats from the seventies and eighties" blended with Max's "vocal inflexions". A violin is heard in the introduction, while Wonder Woman and Marilyn Monroe are lyrically mentioned throughout the song, due to their icon status in femininity. The song's lyrics describes the carefree nature of not crying over an ex.

Critical reception
Several publications have regarded "Salt" to be a "fan-favorite" since its 2018 release. Rania Aniftos of Billboard described the song as an "upbeat, sassy track about having fun after a sad spell", while Madeline Roth of MTV News called it "dance-pop blissfulness". Writing for Stereogum, Chris DeVille wrote that "Salt" is the best song out of Max's discography despite sounding similar to Lady Gaga. Shaoni Das of Music Talkers stated that the song is an "exhilarating dance number, awash in pools of glitter, glamour, and confidence". However, Nicholas Hautman of Us Weekly criticized the song's lyrics for being cliché, specifically noting that it is "about crying so much that you literally run out of the electrolytes needed to form tears".

Commercial performance
"Salt" topped the Polish Airplay Top 100 on the chart issued April 4, 2020, where it was ultimately certified quadruple platinum by the Polish Society of the Phonographic Industry (ZPAV) for track-equivalent sales of 80,000 units on August 11, 2021. In Norway, the song debuted at number 37 on the VG-lista, before peaking at number five. On the Ö3 Austria Top 40 chart, "Salt" debuted at number 71 on the chart dated March 13, 2020. It peaked at number eight on the chart dated April 17, 2020, and was certified platinum by the International Federation of the Phonographic Industry (IFPI) for track-equivalent sales of 30,000 units in the country. In Germany, "Salt" debuted at number 99 on the Offizielle Deutsche Charts dated February 21, 2020, and peaked at number 10 on the chart issued April 10, 2020. The song received a platinum certification by the Bundesverband Musikindustrie (BVMI) for track-equivalent sales of 400,000 units in the country. "Salt" charted in the top 10 in Finland, Russia, Ukraine, and Switzerland, while receiving a platinum certification in Brazil, and gold certifications in France and the United States.

Track listing

Digital download / streaming
 "Salt" 3:00

Digital download / streaming – acoustic
 "Salt" (Acoustic) 3:10

Digital download / streaming – The Remixes
 "Salt" (Syn Cole Remix) 3:11
 "Salt" (Toby Green Remix) 2:47

Spotify streaming
 "Salt" 3:00
 "Torn" 3:18
 "Freaking Me Out" 3:12

Credits and personnel
Credits adapted from "Torn" German CD single and Tidal.

Recording
 Recorded at A Studios, West Hollywood, California

Personnel

 Amanda Ava Koci vocals, songwriting
 Henry Walter songwriting, production, mixing, programming, vocal recording
 Autumn Rowe songwriting
 Madison Love songwriting
 Nicole Morier songwriting
 Chris Gehringer mastering
 Serban Ghenea mixing
 John Hanes engineering

Charts

Weekly charts

Year-end charts

Certifications

Release history

See also
 List of number-one singles of 2020 (Poland)

References

2019 singles
2018 songs
Atlantic Records singles
Ava Max songs
Number-one singles in Poland
Songs written by Cirkut (record producer)
Songs written by Nicole Morier
Songs written by Autumn Rowe
Songs written by Madison Love
Song recordings produced by Cirkut (record producer)
Songs written by Ava Max